Torawati (also known as Tanwarawati or Toravati) was a small chieftainship whose rulers claimed to be direct descendants of Anangpal II, the Tomara king of Delhi. Anangpal established the city of Patan during his rule in the 12th century AD and Torawati was governed from there. The region consisted of some 380 villages spread over 3000 sq kilometres.

References

Further reading 
 

Rajput rulers
Princely states of India
History of Jaipur